Achmad Soebardjo Djojoadisoerjo (23 March 1896 – 15 December 1978) was a diplomat, an Indonesian national hero and the first Foreign Minister of Indonesia.

Early life
Achmad Soebardjo was born in Teluk Jambe, Karawang Regency, West Java, on 23 March 1896. His father was Teuku Muhammad Yusuf, an Acehnese patrician from Pidie. His paternal grandfather was an ulama and his father was the chief of police in Teluk Jambe, Karawang. His mother was Wardinah. She was of Javanese-Buginese descent, from Camat in Telukagung, Cirebon.

Initially, his father gave him the name Teuku Abdul Manaf, but his mother gave him the name Achmad Subardjo. Djojoadisoerjo was added by himself after he was arrested and imprisoned in Ponorogo Prison because of his involvement with the "July 3, 1946 Incident".

He studied at Hogere Burgerschool Jakarta in 1917. He continued to Leiden University, Netherlands and obtained the degree Meester in de Rechten title in the field of law in 1933.

Independence Struggle
As a student, he was active in the fight for Indonesian independence through Jong Java and the Indonesian Students Association, Perhimpoenan Indonesia. In February 1927, Soebardjo, Mohammad Hatta, and three other students represented Indonesia at the conferences of the League against Imperialism in Brussels and later in Germany. At the founding congress in Brussels, Soebardjo and the others met Jawaharlal Nehru and others nationalist leaders from Asia and Africa. Soebardjo spent a couple of months in Berlin and Moscow working for the International Secretariat of the League against Imperialism. Upon return to Indonesia, he became a member of the Investigating Committee for Preparatory Work for Independence (BPUPK) and the Preparatory Committee for Indonesian Independence (PPKI).

On 19 August 1945, two days after the Proclamation of Indonesian Independence on 17 August 1945, Sukarno appointed Soebardjo as the Minister of Foreign Affairs of the Presidential Cabinet, Indonesia's first cabinet for 4 months and immediately started the first Foreign Ministry office at his own residence at Jalan Cikini raya. Subardjo served as Minister of Foreign Affairs again from 1951 to 1952 in Sukiman's Cabinet. In addition, he also became the Ambassador of the Republic of Indonesia to Switzerland from 1957 to 1961.

Death
Soebardjo died at the age of 82 at Pertamina Central Hospital, Kebayoran Baru, from complications with influenza. He was buried at his vacation home in Cipayung, Bogor. In 2009 the government honoured him as a National Hero.

References

People from Karawang Regency
1896 births
1978 deaths
Acehnese people
Indonesian Muslims
National Heroes of Indonesia
Foreign ministers of Indonesia